{{DISPLAYTITLE:C19H16O4}}
The molecular formula C19H16O4 (molar mass: 308.33 g/mol, exact mass: 308.1049 u) may refer to:

 Bisdemethoxycurcumin
 Warfarin